The 2011 League of Ireland First Division season was the 27th season of the League of Ireland First Division. The First Division was contested by 11 teams and Cork City won the title.

Teams

Overview
This season the division featured 11 clubs. This was because Sporting Fingal withdrew from the Premier Division shortly before the season was due to start. Drogheda United, who were originally due to play in the 2011 First Division after being relegated from the 2010 Premier Division, were drafted in to replace Sporting Fingal in the top division. Each team played the other teams three times, totaling 30 games. Cork City finished as champions and were automatically promoted to the Premier Division. Runners up Shelbourne were also promoted, as were third placed Monaghan United after winning a play-off.

Final table

Results

Matches 1–20

Matches 21–30

Promotion/relegation play-off
Galway United, the tenth-placed team in the 2011 Premier Division, and Monaghan United, the third-placed team of the First Division, played off to see who would play in the 2012 Premier Division. The playoff was contested in a two-legged format.

Monaghan United won 5–1 on aggregate and were promoted to the Premier Division. Galway United were relegated to the First Division.

Awards

Top Goalscorers

Player of the Year

See also
 2011 League of Ireland Premier Division
 2011 League of Ireland Cup
 2011 A Championship
 2011 Dundalk F.C. season
 2011 Shamrock Rovers F.C. season

References

 
League of Ireland First Division seasons
2011 League of Ireland
2011 in Republic of Ireland association football leagues
Ireland
Ireland